Abrostola anophioides is a moth of the family Noctuidae first described by Frederic Moore in 1882. It is found in South-east Asia, including Darjeeling and Taiwan.

References 

Plusiinae
Moths of Asia
Moths described in 1882